Ali Mezher (born 22 March 1994 in Beirut) is a professional Lebanese professional basketball player Sagesse SC in the Lebanese Basketball League. 

In the 2016–2017 season, Ali played for Hoops Club and averaged 17.9 ppg, 8.1 assists, 4.4 rebounds and 1.6 steals, then signed a contract with Sagesse Club for the 2017–2018 season. He joined Champville SC the following summer, but returned to Sagesse Club just a year later. Internationally he represents the Lebanese national team, and he is a WABA (West Asian Basketball) champion from 2017. He graduated from the Lebanese Evangelical School for boys and girls L.E.S.

References

eurobasket.com

External links
Ali Mezher at Asia-Basket website

1994 births
Living people
Lebanese men's basketball players
Point guards
Sagesse SC basketball players